Cymindis cordicollis is a species of ground beetle in the subfamily Harpalinae. It was described by V. E. Jakolev in 1887.

References

cordicollis
Beetles described in 1887